The Siberian Elm cultivar Ulmus pumila 'Pendula' is from northern China, where it is known as Lung chao yü shu (: Dragon's-claw elm). It was classified by Frank Meyer in Fengtai in 1908, and introduced to the United States by him from the Peking Botanical Garden as Weeping Chinese Elm. The USDA plant inventory record (1916) noted that it was a "rare variety even in China".  It was confirmed as an U. pumila cultivar by Krüssmann (1962).

Late 19th-century herbarium leaf-specimens suggest that the epithet 'Pendula' has been attached to more than one form of Siberian elm.

The name 'Weeping Chinese Elm' is now sometimes used for Ulmus parvifolia 'Sempervirens', a cultivar of the true Chinese Elm.

Description
Green described 'Pumila' as having pendulous branches bearing small leaves with equal teeth. Frank Meyer's clone from China is a straggling, asymmetrical tree with twisting, often level boughs and occasional tangled branch-ends, and with long pendulous pinnate branchlets, like stouter versions of 'Pinnato-ramosa'. The latter appear in Meyer's 1913 photograph of a specimen in the Peking Botanic Garden.  The tree is smaller than 'Pinnato-ramosa' and does not grow to large dimensions.

Pests and diseases
See under Ulmus pumila.

Cultivation
Meyer's elm is still cultivated in China, where its asymmetrical, contorted habit is clear even in young specimens. It is more rarely cultivated in Europe and North America; it is said to have been "widely distributed" in the northwestern States. The USDA noted (1916) that it "shows up particularly well when planted on embankments alongside water expanses". The tree probably survives in the Longenecker Horticultural Gardens, University of Wisconsin; however, all the specimens grown at the Morton Arboretum, Illinois, obtained in the 1950s had either died or been felled by 2008 because of their poor condition.

Standards supplied in the West today as U. pumila 'Pendula' appear to be a more symmetrical and neatly shaped clone than Meyer's.

Notable trees
Old examples of 'Pendula', resembling Meyer's 1908 photograph of a mature specimen in Fengtai, survive in Edinburgh (2018). The largest (height 12 m, girth over 2 m), presumably the UK champion, overlooks Ferry Road Path, between 7 and 9 Rosebank Rd. Two others stand at the intersection of Royal Crescent and Dundonald St and at 47 York Rd. There are trees of the same type opposite the Rosebank Rd elm on the other side of Ferry Road Path. The USDA (1916) recommended the cultivar for planting on bank tops, where its silhouette could best be appreciated. Most of the Edinburgh specimens have been planted in such locations. A probable example grows at the Friston Forest car park in East Sussex, England; cloned in 2011, a specimen is now under analysis at the Royal Botanic Gardens Kew.

Accessions
Europe
Grange Farm Arboretum, Lincolnshire, UK. Acc. no. 1143.

Synonymy
Ulmus campestris (: minor) pendula.
Ulmus sibirica Hort..
Ulmus pumila Linn. cv. 'Pendula' Kirchner.

Nurseries

Europe
Plantenmarkt Boskoop, 3755 MX Eemnes, Netherlands

References

External links
 Sheet labelled U. pumila L. 'Pendula' (specimen in Zuiderpark, The Hague, 1940)
 Formerly labelled U. pumila 'Pendula' (Wageningen Arboretum, 1962)
 Formerly labelled U. pumila 'Pendula' (Wageningen Arboretum, 1962)

Siberian elm cultivar
Ulmus articles with images
Ulmus